Amanda Coetzer was the defending champion, but did not compete this year.

Arantxa Sánchez Vicario won the title by defeating Amy Frazier 6–1, 6–2 in the final.

Seeds

Draw

Finals

Top half

Bottom half

References

External links
 Official results archive (ITF)
 Official results archive (WTA)

Nichirei International Championships
1994 WTA Tour